Thomas Schie (born 1 December 1975, in Oslo) is a former racing and rally driver. He previously competed in the International Formula 3000, Swedish Touring Car Championship and World Rally Championship.

Career

Racing
Schie started his autoracing career in the Swedish Formula Ford Junior championship. Schie, as the only foreigner in the championship, finished third. Moving up the ladder Schie moved into the Scandinavian Formula Opel Lotus championship. After finished seventh in the season he joined Team Norway at the Formula Opel Lotus Nations Cup. At Circuit Park Zandvoort Schie finished eighth with this teammate Tommy Rustad. For the 1995 season the Norwegian driver moved to the United States of America to race in the Barber Dodge Pro Series. After a tough start of the season, in which he had a number of retirements, Schie finished strong. Due to two third-place finishes at the end of the season the Norwegian finished his inaugural season in the Barber Dodge Pro Series seventh in the standings. The following season was more successful. Schie won both races at Mazda Raceway Laguna Seca. The driver from Oslo finished second in the standings second to fellow Scandinavian Fredrik Larsson.

Following his success he returned to Europe to race in the International Formula 3000 for Bob Salisbury Engineering. The team was in their second year of F3000, Schie was joined by Oliver Gavin as his teammate. Gavin was replaced by James Taylor as of round four. All three drivers struggled to qualify for the races. Schie qualified for five out of ten rounds. The first race Schie participated in was the 1997 Pau Grand Prix. Eleven drivers failed to qualify. The Norwegian finished fourteenth out of 22 drivers. His best result came at Spa where he finished tenth.

After failing to gain enough sponsorship for another F3000 season Schie returned to the Barber Dodge Pro Series. Since he left the series the original car was replaced by the state-of-the-art Reynard 98E. Schie returned to the series where he left of, as a frontrunner. Schie finished third in the first round at Sebring International Raceway, behind Todd Snyder and Victor Gonzalez, Jr. The Norwegian won the races at Lime Rock Park and Cleveland. He eventually finished third in the final standings.

The Norwegian driver focused on his touring car career following his strong Barber Dodge Pro Series season. Schie raced an Alfa Romeo 156 TS in the very competitive Swedish Touring Car Championship. Despite missing a number of races Schie finished eighth in the championship, the first placed Alfa Romeo. His best result was a second place at Mantorp Park. Schie returned to the STCC in 2008 and 2009. He joined Chevrolet Motorsport Sweden achieving a second place in the 2008 Göteborg City Race. In 2009 Schie left the series after the first Göteborg race. Schie claimed that the team did not live up to his professional expectations. Team boss Nicklas Karlsson claims however that Schie did not fulfill his financial obligations.

Rally
Following the 1999 STCC season Schie focused on his rally ambitions. After racing in national rallies and in the European Rally Championship the Norwegian made his World Rally Championship debut in 2002. He entered a Toyota Corolla WRC in the Swedish Rally. After running in the top fifty Schie had to retire from the rally following a broken transmission after special stage nine. Schie won his first international rally in 2003. Schie won the Uno-X Saaremaa Rally near Kuressaare, Estonia. Schie beat Mats Jonsson among other international rally drivers. Thomas Schie won the Norwegian Rally Championship in 2004, 2005 and 2006. He won nine rallies to collect his three titles. Schie made his last WRC outing at the 2007 Rally Catalunya. He scored his best result in a WRC rally finishing twelfth.

Current life
Currently Schie is a manager at a workwear retailer and is a Formula One analyst for Viasat. He is also still based in Oslo.

Racing record

Complete International Formula 3000 results
(key) (Races in bold indicate pole position) (Races in italics indicate fastest lap)

American open–wheel racing results
(key) (Races in bold indicate pole position)

Partial Barber Dodge Pro Series results

Complete Swedish Touring Car Championship results
(key) (Races in bold indicate pole position) (Races in italics indicate fastest lap)

Complete WRC results

Czech Rally Championship results

References

1975 births
Sportspeople from Oslo
Norwegian rally drivers
Norwegian racing drivers
World Rally Championship drivers
European Rally Championship drivers
Swedish Touring Car Championship drivers
Barber Pro Series drivers
Formula Ford drivers
International Formula 3000 drivers
Motorsport announcers
Living people
EFDA Nations Cup drivers